Bodoland Martyrs Gold Cup is a football league cup in the Bodoland Territorial Region, Assam, India, organised by Kokrajhar District Sports Association (KDSA) in memory of Bodoland martyrs, who sacrificed their lives for the cause of Bodoland movement.

The 21st edition of the tournament was won by United Chirang Duar FC, Runikatha by defeating Baarhoongkha Athletic Club, Kokrajhar 1–0 in the final, played at Banargaon Jaiklong Sports Club ground. They got I-League 2 qualifier spot, since the Assam State Premier League has not been held.

2017 season
The 2017 season was won by Gobinda Basumatary FC (GBFC) from Gossaigaon defeating NF Railway Sports Club, Maligaon by a scoreline of 1–0. Chuinedu Gnene scored the lone goal in the 70th minute. 

A trophy and cash award of Rs 1 lakh was handed over to the champion team by BTC chief Hagrama Mohilary. Doneswar Goyari, Executive Member of BTC handed over the runners-up trophy along with cash award of Rs 50,000 to the NF Railway team. IGP BTAD Anurag Agarwal gave away the best player of the match trophy along with a cash award of Rs 5,000 to Chuinedu Gnene of GBFC.

Results

See also
 Assam Football Association
 Bordoloi Trophy
 ATPA Shield
 Bodousa Cup
 Independence Day Cup

References

Bodoland
Football in Assam
Football cup competitions in India
Recurring sporting events established in 2000
2000 establishments in Assam